The White Cliffs of Dover is a 1944 American war drama film based on the verse novel The White Cliffs by Alice Duer Miller. It was made by Metro-Goldwyn-Mayer, directed by Clarence Brown, and produced by Clarence Brown and Sidney Franklin. The screenplay was by Claudine West,  and George Froeschel, with the credit for additional poetry by Robert Nathan. Nathan stated in an interview that he wrote the screenplay as his first work as a contracted writer for MGM but the studio credited Claudine West who died in 1943 as a tribute to her.

Plot
At the height of World War II, American-born Susan, Lady Ashwood, (Irene Dunne) is a nurse in a British hospital, awaiting the arrival of 300 wounded men. Via flashback, she thinks back to how she came to Britain many years before.

In 1914, Susan and her father, small-town Rhode Island newspaper publisher Hiram P. Dunn (Frank Morgan), come to Britain, intending to stay for two weeks. Old Colonel Forsythe (C. Aubrey Smith) introduces Susan to Sir John Ashwood (Alan Marshal), a baronet and one of the landed gentry, with an estate and manor house. They fall in love, and despite some friction over her being American, they marry.

Their honeymoon is cut short when World War I breaks out. John is also an army officer; he rejoins his regiment and goes to war in France. Susan and John's mother, Lady Jean (Gladys Cooper), wait for news, good or bad. John's brother Reggie (John Warburton) is killed in action. John finally gets a chance to be with Susan for a few days in France, which they spend in Dieppe. During their stay, the United States declares war on Germany.

Susan returns to Britain and has a son, also named John. She, baby John, and Colonel Forsythe watch as newly arrived American troops parade through London. John is killed near the end of the fighting, never having seen his wife again or his son.

Susan and young John (Roddy McDowall) live in the Ashwood manor house with Lady Jean. Having inherited the baronetcy, he is addressed as "Sir John", even as a boy, and takes seriously his duties as proprietor of the manor. He develops a childhood infatuation with Betsy Kenney (Elizabeth Taylor), daughter of a tenant farmer. Young John invites two visiting German boys to the manor for tea. The German boys shock the Ashwoods by spouting bellicose militaristic sentiments.

Susan becomes afraid that there will be another war and that she will lose young John as she lost his father. After Lady Jean dies, she decides to sell the manor and take John to America. But when she tells him why, John refuses, insisting that he will go into the army as his father did, and fight for Britain if war comes. Susan changes her mind, and they stay in Britain.

World War II begins, and Sir John (now played by Peter Lawford) becomes an officer, while his sweetheart Betsy (now played by June Lockhart) becomes a Wren.

The flashback ends, as wounded men arrive at Susan's hospital. To Susan's horror, John is among them, severely wounded. Later, in the wards, a doctor tells Susan John is dying. John tells her he was wounded in fighting at Dieppe and of an American soldier who died near him. He speaks of the importance of winning a complete victory and a lasting peace. At that moment, American soldiers again parade through London, passing by the hospital. Susan proudly describes them to John as he dies.

Differences from source
The source poem has no mention of a romantic partner for Susan's son, John. The poem clearly states that John is following his father into the army, but ends with only Susan's fear that John might die in the war, not that he has even been sent to fight yet.

Cast

 Irene Dunne as Susan Ashwood
 Alan Marshal as Sir John Ashwood
 Roddy McDowall as John Ashwood II as a boy
 Frank Morgan as Hiram Porter Dunn
 Van Johnson as Sam Bennett
 C. Aubrey Smith as Colonel Walter Forsythe
 Dame May Whitty as Nanny
 Gladys Cooper as Lady Jean Ashwood
 Peter Lawford as John Ashwood II as a young man
 John Warburton as Reggie Ashwood
 Jill Esmond as Rosamund
 Brenda Forbes as Gwennie
 Norma Varden as Mrs. Bland
 Edmund Breon as Major Rupert Bancroft (uncredited)
 Franklyn Farnum as Ball Guest (uncredited)
 June Lockhart as Betsy Kenney as an adult (uncredited)
 Miles Mander as Major Loring at Hospital (uncredited)
 J. Pat O'Malley as Martin (uncredited)
 Elizabeth Taylor as Betsy Kenney at age 10 (uncredited)
 Ian Wolfe as skipper of honeymoon boat (uncredited)
 Arthur Shields as Benson (uncredited)
 Bunny Gordon as John Ashwood II at age six months (uncredited)

Production 
The picture was released in May 1944, before the June 6 D-Day Allied landings in Normandy. 

Among the many foreshadowings that would resonate with audiences is a scene set in the early 1930s, where two German brothers, sons of a prominent German manufacturer, visit the Ashwood estate. The younger boy remarks that the estate's large lawns would be ideal for military gliders to land - a premonition of the airborne attacks launched by Nazi Germany. His older brother instantly tries to defuse the situation—their father prepared them with stock answers for the trip. But when Hiram Dunn mentions Germany's loss of the last war, the boy explodes, revealing the indoctrination the boys have received from their Hitler Youth groups. The boys go off to play tennis, and Dunn tells his daughter that war is coming.

Herbert Stothart weaves a number of evocative pieces of music through his score, including: Auld Lang Syne. Hurrah boys, for England, Land of Hope and Glory, My Country Tis of Thee/God Save the King, Home! Sweet Home!, Sweet Afton, There's a Long, Long Trail, Do ye Ken John Peel, The Minstrel Boy to the War Has Gone, Pack up Your Troubles in Your Old Kit-Bag, The Star Spangled Banner (National Anthem of the United States), The Stars and Stripes Forever (national March of the United States), Over There, Vive la Compagnie, Coventry Carol (Woe is me, poor child for thee), America (My Country Tis of Thee), Greensleeves, When Johnny Comes Marching Home. 

John dies and the film ends as American troops march triumphantly past the hospital, the bands playing When Johnny Comes Marching Home. The last shot of the film is of the men marching toward the audience.

Box office
According to MGM records, the film was a big hit and earned $6,294,000 (equivalent to $ million in ) at the box office, resulting in a profit of $1,784,000 (equivalent to $ million in ).

The film was nominated for the Academy Award for Best Cinematography in Black and White.

Adaptations
White Cliffs of Dover was adapted as a radio play on the September 18, 1946, episode of Academy Award Theater, starring Irene Dunne in her original film role.

See also
 White Cliffs of Dover the geologic formation.

Notes

External links

1944 films
1944 romantic drama films
1940s war drama films
American black-and-white films
American romantic drama films
American war drama films
Films based on poems
Films directed by Clarence Brown
Films scored by Herbert Stothart
Films set in country houses
Films set in England
Films set on the home front during World War II
Metro-Goldwyn-Mayer films
Western Front (World War I) films
American World War I films
World War II films made in wartime
Films based on works by Alice Duer Miller
1940s English-language films